Erith Gwyn Nicholls (15 July 1874 – 24 March 1939) was a Welsh rugby union player who gained 24 caps for Wales as a centre. Nicholls was known as the "Prince of Threequarters".

Born in Westbury-on-Severn, Nicholls started his rugby career with Cardiff Star before playing in the Cardiff first team from 1893. He spent all his playing career with Cardiff, playing 18 seasons for them, apart from half a season with Newport in 1901/2 when he began a laundry business there with fellow Welsh international Bert Winfield. He captained Cardiff for four seasons; 1898/9 through to 1900/1 and again in 1903/04.

International career 

Nicholls gained his first international cap against Scotland on 25 January 1896, a solid if not spectacular debut. His next few games gained him praise and Nicholls began to get more notice from the local press, Nicholls international career was placed on pause for twelve months during 1897 and 1898 while Wales were excluded from playing because of the Gould Affair.

His 24 caps for Wales were won between 1896 and 1906 and included ten matches as captain. He was captain of the Triple Crown winning side of 1902. Despite announcing his retirement from international rugby at the end of the previous season, he returned in 1905 to captain Wales in the famous Match of the Century, a victory against New Zealand. He toured Australia with the British Isles team of 1899, and was the only Welsh player on this tour.

International matches played for Wales 
Wales
  1897, 1898, 1899, 1901, 1902, 1904, 1906
  1896, 1898, 1899, 1900, 1901, 1902, 1903, 1905, 1906
  1905
  1896, 1899, 1900, 1901, 1902, 1906
  1906

Post playing career 
In 1909 Nicholls was chosen to officiate the match between England and Scotland at the Richmond Athletic Ground, as part of the Home Nations Championship. It was the only international match that Nicholls refereed and the last to be played at Richmond.

Later life and death 

In 1923, Nicholls while on holiday in Weston-super-Mare was involved in a rescue attempt involving two young girls. The two girls had been swept out to sea by the undertow and a doctor, Edward Holborow, had leapt into the sea to save them. Although the two girls were saved by another swimmer, Dr Holborow found the rough conditions too challenging, and Nicholls attempted to rescue him. Nicholls reached the doctor and got him close to the shore but Holborow was pronounced dead at the scene. Nicholls only managed to reach shore himself and his health never recovered from the ordeal. On 24 March 1939, Nicholls died in Dinas Powys. Heart failure was given as the cause of death.

On Boxing Day 1949 the "Gwyn Nicholls Memorial Gates" were officially opened at Cardiff Arms Park by his team mate Rhys Gabe. On 16 November 2005 Gwyn Nicholls was inducted into the International Rugby Hall of Fame.

External links

Bibliography

References 

1874 births
1939 deaths
British & Irish Lions rugby union players from Wales
Cardiff RFC players
Newport RFC players
Rugby union centres
Rugby union players from Westbury-on-Severn
Wales international rugby union players
Wales rugby union captains
Welsh rugby union players
Welsh rugby union referees
World Rugby Hall of Fame inductees